Chunkhola Union is a Union parishad of Mollahat Upazila, Bagerhat District in Khulna Division of Bangladesh. It has an area of 67.08 km2 (25.90 sq mi) and a population of 15,782.

References

Unions of Mollahat Upazila
Unions of Bagerhat District
Unions of Khulna Division